Dyschirius natalensis is a species of ground beetle in the subfamily Scaritinae. It was described by Fedorenko in 1997.

References

natalensis
Beetles described in 1997